The disease model of addiction describes an addiction as a disease with biological, neurological, genetic, and environmental sources of origin.  The traditional medical model of disease requires only that an abnormal condition be present that causes discomfort, dysfunction, or distress to the affected individual. The contemporary medical model attributes addiction, in part, to changes in the brain's mesolimbic pathway.  The medical model also takes into consideration that such disease may be the result of other biological, psychological or sociological entities despite an incomplete understanding of the mechanisms of these entities.

The common biomolecular mechanisms underlying all forms of addiction – CREB and ΔFosB – were reviewed by Eric J. Nestler in a 2013 review.

Genetic factors and mental disorders can contribute to the severity of drug addiction. Approximately fifty percent of the chance a person will develop an addiction can be attributed to genetic factors.

Criticism
Critics of the disease model, particularly those who subscribe to the life-process model of addiction argue that labeling people as addicts keeps them from developing self-control and stigmatizes them.  As noted by the harm reduction specialist Andrew Tatarsky:

See also
Addiction psychology

References

Addiction psychiatry